Hauptwerk is a computer program from Milan Digital Audio that allows the playback or live performance of pipe organ music using MIDI and recorded sound samples.

Name 
The name "Hauptwerk" is German for the "great manual" of an organ, from Haupt- (meaning ‘main’) and Werk (literally meaning ‘work’, but in this instance meaning a complete organ pipe cabinet and all its included ranks).

History
Hauptwerk was originally developed and launched in 2002 by Martin Dyde, who, starting 2006, continued to develop it under Crumhorn Labs Ltd. In September 2008, Crumhorn Labs and Hauptwerk were acquired by Brett Milan of Milan Digital Audio LLC.

Product history

Version 1
Released 2002
 Available for Windows only
 Stops operated by MIDI Note messages
 Simple Swell simulation (volume only)
 Organ of St Annes, Moseley included

Version 2
Released 2006 
 Available as VSTi plugin
 More flexibility in MIDI configuration
 Phase alignment of release samples
 Harmonic Swell simulation

Version 3
Released November 2007  
 Support for Mac OS X
 Support for Multiple Touch-Screens
 Voicing Control for individual pipes

Version 4
Released April 2011  
 Redesigned User Interface
 Automatic facility to configure MIDI to support most manufacturers
 Inbuilt MIDI recorder/player
 User defined Combinations/Crescendos
 Master Couplers available with all organs

Version 5 
Released December 2019 

 Redesigned Audio Output Routing
 3D Sound output
 Impulse Response reverb capabilities
Removed Free Edition

Version 6 
Released November 2020

 Menu changes
 Combination system changes
 MIDI changes
 Audio engine changes
 Small changes + bug fixes

Methodology

Hauptwerk produces an audio signal in response to input received via the manual MIDI keyboard. This input may originate from an external MIDI keyboard or from a MIDI sequencing program. An organ is constructed using a set of recorded sample files in conjunction with an XML configuration file that defines organ parameters, such as ranks, stops, manuals, coupling and organ images for display in Hauptwerk's user interface.

The audio output is based on recorded samples which are then modified by several different technologies.

Sample playback
The recorded samples of the original pipes are divided into 3 main sections: start (attack), middle (sustain), and end (release or echo). When a note is played, the attack sample is played, followed by a loop of the sustain section. Start, end, and release loop points are stored in the recorded sample file. When the note is released, the release or echo section of the sample is used, or specific release sample files can be defined for a note, or range of notes. This latter feature is useful in making the organ more realistic. For example, the echo of a pipe after a short period differs from that of a pipe that has been sounding for longer. Hauptwerk selects from multiple release samples based on the duration of the note. Tremulant effects are possible using LFO sample files to dynamically modify the sound, avoiding the need to create individual tremulant note sample files.

Harmonic filtering
An organist moving an Expression pedal affects both the volume and frequency envelope of the affected pipes. Hauptwerk adjusts both of these parameters using information provided within the sample-set. This adjustment is based on measurements taken from the original instrument.

Physical modeling
The wind pressure of an organ pipe affects its volume, pitch, and character. Hauptwerk uses Fluid dynamics to model the movement of air through the various parts of a pipe-organ. This information is then used to modify the sampled sound.

Randomization
Randomization is used to modify certain aspects of the audio output. The pitch of individual pipes can be randomly modified when a sample is loaded into memory. If multiple loop points are provided, in the sustain section of a sample, these are selected randomly. Additionally, Hauptwerk simulates some other effects, such as Wind Turbulence, using Randomization during playback.

Organ sample-sets

Since the launch of Hauptwerk,  numberdent companies have recorded organs and made these available for use with Hauptwek.  By March ,2009 more than 50 organs had been recordd.  Threcordings ese include some notable organs in many different count,ries inclu the followingding:

 Bavokerk, Haarlem, Netherlands
 Bovenkerk, Kampen, Netherlands
 Eglise de Saint Etienne, Caen, France
 Laurenskerk, Rotterdam, Netherlands
 Palace of Arts (Budapest), Hungary
 Salisbury Cathedral, UK
 Stadtkirche, Waltershausen, Germany
 Martinikerk, Groningen, Netherlands
 Melbourne Town Hall, Australia

Salisbury Cathedral 
In March 2009, Milan Digital Audio announced that permission had been granted to record the Father Willis organ at Salisbury Cathedral, UK.

Beginning February 23, 2010, the Salisbury Cathedral pipe organ was temporarily unavailable, because of maintenance work scheduled to last one month. During this time, a console based on Hauptwerk was used to provide organ music for cathedral services.

According to an article on the Salisbury Cathedral website: "Over the past few weeks we have used the organs from Metz Cathedral, France, St Georgenkirche, Roetha, Germany, and Our Lady of Mt. Carmel, Chicago, IL., USA". The article continues: "Volume I of our very own Father Willis Organ was released by Milan Digital Audio just days before my organ was installed into the cathedral which has allowed me to use 28 of the 65 stops of the Father Willis organ in its natural acoustic. It is believed to be the first time a sampled instrument has been used in its own building for services!"

Composite Sample Sets
The custom organ design module allows Hauptwerk users to create custom organs by mixing two or more existing sample sets to create a custom organ. One can select certain ranks from one organ and from another and combine them to create a personal and unique organ, while also adding enhanced features and voicing which the original sample sets do not offer. Examples include:

 Aristide no. 1 (Hauptwerk-organ.com)
 Grand Symphonic Composite
 Composite of Saint Sulpitius (Organa Reginae Caeli)
 Composite of Our Lady of Paris (Organa Reginae Caeli)

Copy protection older versions and iLok

Hauptwerk was copy protected using the HASP USB token (dongle) from Aladdin Knowledge Systems.

The USB token was used to control the functionality of the single Hauptwerk program which was licensed in three editions:
Free edition – Free download and use without USB token but limited to 1.5GB sample memory and 256 polyphony, stereo output.
Basic edition – Purchased license with USB token.  Up to 3GB sample memory and 1024 polyphony
Advanced edition – Purchased license with USB token. No imposed memory or polyphony limit, multiple audio channels and MIDI output.

The USB token was also used by some companies to enforce license conditions of individual sample sets. This may apply to the release of historic recordings with restrictions on the customization and re-use of the sounds.

Since the release of Hauptwerk version 5, Hauptwerk is using the licensing platform iLok by Pace Anti Piracy. There are now only two editions:

 Lite – Subscription license, limited to 1024 polyphony
 Advanced – Subscription or Perpetual license.

See also
Pipe organ
Electronic organ
List of MIDI editors and sequencers
MIDI usage and applications
List of music software

References

External links
 Hauptwerk
 PCorgan - Site with comprehensive information about Hauptwerk and links to many related sites (available in Dutch and English)
 contrebombarde - Site with over 25,000 audio recordings made using Hauptwerk
 Music Site - a site with illustrations for building a console and with explanations of how Hauptwerk works
 "All about Hauptwerk", Kenneth A Spencer. . 244 pages - A detailed guide to Hauptwerk

MacOS multimedia software
Windows multimedia software
Keyboard software synthesizers
MIDI